Villas, also known as the Villas,  is an unincorporated community and census-designated place (CDP) located within Lower Township, in Cape May County, New Jersey, United States. At the 2010 census, the CDP's population was 9,483.

Villas is the site of Blitz's Market, where one of the four winning Mega Millions lottery tickets was sold to a veteran with a disability on August 31, 2007.

Geography
According to the United States Census Bureau, the CDP had a total area of 3.909 square miles (10.124 km2), including 3.883 square miles (10.058 km2) of land and 0.026 square miles (0.067 km2) of water (0.66%).

Demographics

Census 2010

Census 2000
At the 2000 census there were 9,064 people, 3,733 households, and 2,456 families in the CDP. The population density was 881.5/km2 (2,281.4/mi2). There were 5,694 housing units at an average density of 553.8/km2 (1,433.2/mi2). The racial makeup of the CDP was 96.35% White, 1.19% African American, 0.28% Native American, 0.35% Asian, 0.03% Pacific Islander, 0.86% from other races, and 0.94% from two or more races. Hispanic or Latino of any race were 2.41% of the population.

Of the 3,733 households 28.9% had children under the age of 18 living with them, 47.9% were married couples living together, 13.3% had a female householder with no husband present, and 34.2% were non-families. 29.5% of households were one person and 15.5% were one person aged 65 or older. The average household size was 2.43 and the average family size was 2.98.

The age distribution was 25.6% under the age of 18, 6.6% from 18 to 24, 26.5% from 25 to 44, 22.3% from 45 to 64, and 19.1% 65 or older. The median age was 39 years. For every 100 females, there were 91.9 males. For every 100 females age 18 and over, there were 86.4 males.

The median household income was $33,563 and the median family income  was $38,950. Males had a median income of $32,996 versus $21,723 for females. The per capita income for the CDP was $16,696. About 8.3% of families and 10.4% of the population were below the poverty line, including 14.3% of those under age 18 and 5.8% of those age 65 or over.

Education

As with other parts of Lower Township, it is served by Lower Township School District for primary grades and Lower Cape May Regional School District for secondary grades.

One of the Lower Township elementary school facilities, David C. Douglass Memorial Elementary School (pre-Kindergarten and Kindergarten), is in Villas CDP. The other three elementary schools are in Cold Spring: Carl T. Mitnick (grades 1–2), Maud Abrams (grades 3–4), and Sandman Consolidated (grades 5–6). The LCMR schools (Richard Teitelman Middle and Lower Cape May Regional High School) are in the Erma area.

Students are also eligible to attend Cape May County Technical High School in Cape May Court House, which serves students from the entire county in its comprehensive and vocational programs, which are offered without charge to students who are county residents. Special needs students may be referred to Cape May County Special Services School District in the Cape May Court House area.

Wildwood Catholic Academy (PreK-12) in North Wildwood, of the Roman Catholic Diocese of Camden, is the closest Catholic school. Villas CDP had its own Catholic K-8 school, St. Raymond's School, until 2007, when it merged into Our Lady Star of the Sea School in Cape May. In 2010 that school merged into Cape Trinity Regional School (PreK – 8) in North Wildwood. That school in turn merged into Wildwood Catholic Academy in 2020.

Cape May County Library operates the Lower Township Library in Villas.

Notable people

People who were born in, residents of, or otherwise closely associated with Villas include:
 Michael Linnington (born 1958), CEO of Wounded Warrior Project
 Steven Rappaport, performer with The Ran-Dells, which was a one-hit wonder with the song "Martian Hop".

References

External links

 The Cape May Gazette Newspaper serving Villas

Census-designated places in Cape May County, New Jersey
Lower Township, New Jersey